The Pawn of Fate is a lost 1916 American silent drama film directed by Maurice Tourneur and starring George Beban, Doris Kenyon and Charles W. Charles.

The film's sets were designed by the art director Ben Carré.

Cast
 George Beban as Pierre Dufrene  
 Doris Kenyon as Marcine Dufrene  
 Charles W. Charles as Father Dufrene  
 John Davidson as André Lesar  
 Johnny Hines as Giradot
 Alec B. Francis as Abbé Paul  
 Mary Booth as Suzanne

References

Bibliography
 Waldman, Harry. Maurice Tourneur: The Life and Films. McFarland, 2001.

External links

1916 films
1916 drama films
Silent American drama films
Films directed by Maurice Tourneur
American silent feature films
1910s English-language films
American black-and-white films
Lost American films
World Film Company films
1916 lost films
Lost drama films
1910s American films